The Nakéty River is a river of New Caledonia.

See also
List of rivers of New Caledonia

References

Rivers of New Caledonia